The 2012–13 East Carolina Pirates men's basketball team represented East Carolina University during the 2012–13 NCAA Division I men's basketball season. The Pirates, led by third year head coach Jeff Lebo, played their home games at Williams Arena at Minges Coliseum and were members of Conference USA. They finished the season 23–12, 9–7 in C-USA play to finish in a tie for fourth place. They lost in the quarterfinals of the Conference USA tournament to Tulsa. They were invited to the 2013 CIT where they defeated Savannah State, Rider, Loyola (MD), Evansville, and Weber State to be the 2013 CIT Champions.

Roster

Schedule

|-
!colspan=9| Regular season

|-
!colspan=9| 2013 Conference USA men's basketball tournament

|-
!colspan=9| 2013 CIT

References

East Carolina Pirates men's basketball seasons
East Carolina
East Carolina
CollegeInsider.com Postseason Tournament championship seasons
East Carolina Pirates
East Carolina Pirates